JSC Kalashnikov Concern, known until 2013 as the Izhevsk Machine-Building Plant, is a Russian defense manufacturing concern and joint-stock company headquartered in the city of Izhevsk in the Republic of Udmurtia as well as the capital city of Moscow. The concern designs and produces a wide range of civilian and military weapons including assault rifles, sniper rifles, designated marksman rifles, machine guns, squad automatic weapons, hunting rifles, shotguns, guided artillery projectiles, and a wide range of other precision weapons including remote controlled weapon stations, unmanned vehicles and military robots.

The Kalashnikov Concern produces about 95% of all small arms in Russia and supplies to more than 27 countries around the world, making it the largest firearm manufacturer in Russia. Notable products include the Kalashnikov (AK) assault rifle series, the RPK light machine gun series, the Dragunov SVD semi-automatic sniper rifle, the SKS semi-automatic carbine, the Makarov PM pistol, the Saiga-12 shotgun, and the submachine guns Vityaz-SN and PP-19 Bizon. These firearms, except for the SVD, SKS and the PM, were based on the famous AK series, due to its reliability to endure harsh conditions, low production costs, availability in nearly every geographical region, and ease of use.

As of 2018, 26% of the Concern's shares belong to Rostec, while 74% of the company belongs to private investors (Alexey Krivoruchko, Andrei Bokarev and Nikolaos i. Panagogiannopoulos).

The Concern contains three firearm brands: "Kalashnikov" (combat and civilian weapons), "Baikal" (hunting and civilian guns), and "Izhmash" (sporting rifles). The concern is developing new business lines that include remote weapon stations, unmanned aerial and ground vehicles, and multi-functional special-purpose boats.

History

First years 
An armory in the city of Izhevsk was established by the order of the Emperor of All Russia Alexander I on 10 June 1807 and Andrey Deryabin, the chief mining engineer of the city's iron works, was put in charge with both construction and operation. Architect Semyon Emelianovich Dudin and Deryabin both developed a general long-term plan of further complex growth of the armory. The armory would be located at the bank of the Izh River, mainly due to the proximity of iron works, which immediately solved all the raw material supply problems.

Deryabin employed Russian and Udmurtian plowmen living in the city. At that time, plowmen were to migrate to the armory and work there. Settlements nearby were released from this rule, but had to provide the armory with wagons, horses and harnessing. Deryabin also hired foreign armory specialists to guide the Russian craftsmen. In 1807, the Armory produced 7 long guns, 5 pair of pistols, and 6 backswords.

The first weapons developed by the armory were the No. 15 17.7mm muskets, produced in the autumn of 1807. In 1808, the musket was later mass-produced for infantry equipping. The plant supplied the Imperial Russian Army with over 6,000 of the No. 15 17.7mm muskets. The armory also produced rifles, muskets, carbines, and flint blunderbusses for cavalry in 1809. The venture also produced pistols and gun parts and remelted trophy weapons. Firearms were produced at a rapid pace for the Russian Army during the Napoleonic Wars, mainly in the French invasion of Russia, even though construction of the armory had not been finished yet. During the first four years, the factory produced 2,000 long guns. In 1814, the output grew up to 10,000 guns and almost 2,500 backswords. By 1830, the armory achieved the desired annual output of 25,000 long guns and 5,000 backswords.

Ten stone plants, several wooden constructions and a towered main building for the armory were erected in 1811–1816. By 1817, construction of the main armory building had been finished. It had 4 floors and was one of the first multistory industrial buildings in Russia. The manufacturing process was multilevel: it began with rough preparatory works (at lower floors) and finished with assembly of arms (at higher floors).

Mid to Late 1800s 
Starting in the 1830s, the armory started manufacturing "Gartung" short rifles, "Phalis" breech-loading rifles, and boarding guns for the Baltic Fleet of the Imperial Russian Navy. In 1835, the armory transferred cold steel production of swords and lances to Zlatoust, focusing mainly on firearm production. In 1844, the armory started upgrading current guns into more rapid firing percussion muskets. The armory also started using the caplock mechanism for its products in 1845. During the Crimean War, Izhevsk supplied the Russian Imperial Army with 130,000 rifles, with a third of them grooved. By 1857, 50 years after the creation of the armory, over 670,000 flintlock firearms, over 220,000 percussion firearms, over 58 thousand rifles, as well as a plentiful number of swords and lances were produced.

In 1867, the armory was reorganized into a lease and a private commercial enterprise. At this time, the armory was retrofitted and equipped with steam-engines, new machines, and an open-hearth furnace. This allowed the armory to produce more breech-loading weapons for the Russian Imperial Army, notably the "Krnk" and "Berdan" type rifles. The Berdan rifle was the most widely produced firearm at the plant during the time as well, indirectly allowing Russia to approach the European industrial empires' level of armaments.

By 1870, production rate at the armory exceeded both the armories of Tula and Sestroretsk. Later, when the methods of high-quality steel production were well mastered, Izhevsk became the source of gun barrels and barrel receivers for Russian plants. For example, armory enterprises in Tula used annually up to 360,000 barrels from the armory at Izhevsk. In 1884, the plant was later returned to the state and became Izhevsk Gun and Steel Factories (IGSF). In 1885, IGSF started manufacturing hunting weapons and tools. In 1891, IGSF started mass-producing the Mosin–Nagant rifle. The IGSF also started using DC generators to produce electricity to illuminate the plant as well as to power the machines. The IGSF was the only Russian enterprise that produced firearms for all branches of the Russian military. Thanks to the IGSF, Izhevsk became a large industrial center in Russia.

World War I and the Interwar Period 
During the First World War, IGSF supplied the Imperial Russian Army with over 1.4 million new rifles and approximately 188,000 remelted shoulder weapons. Prior to the Russian Revolution, the IGSF took leading positions of the Russian defense industry in terms of manufacturing and manpower capacity. By 1917, about 34,000 people worked at IGSF. In 1918, a design bureau was established in the IGSF.
After the formation of the Soviet Union in 1922, large changes came to the IGSF. The state's first hunting gun factory was opened on the enterprise's premises in the same year. The IGSF required more highly trained personnel in order to accommodate new production and to work on newer machines. Thus, by 1929, IGSF-bound personnel had to be trained at the Izhevsk Technical School. In 1930, a new open-hearth furnace was put into operation and in-house production of machines at the factory was launched.

More re-organization took place in the 1930s, including the conversion of the IGSF into a Chief Designer Bureau, as well as the adoption and production of several new models of firearms: a modified Mosin–Nagant rifle design of 1891/1930, the battle rifle AVS-36, made by Sergei Simonov, and the SVT-38 self-loading rifle and the TT pistol, made by Fedor Tokorev. This gave rise to a flow line method of production. In 1938, the conveyor belt was implemented into the assembly of gun barrels and other parts, greatly increasing the production rate of firearms for the Soviet Army. In 1933, a New Design Bureau, "BNK", was established at the factory to develop and modify firearms. Today, the bureau is named the "Armory Design Center" (KOC). In the bureau's lifetime, about 300 models of small-arms, air ordnance, sport, hunting weapons, and other types of equipment were developed, most of which was in series production at the plant. In 1939, the main plant of the IGSF, Plant No. 180,was split into two independent enterprises: Metallurgical Plant No. 71 and Engineering Plant No. 74, which manufactured weapons. Engineering Plant No. 74 would later be renamed the Izhevsk Machine-Building Plant, or simply, Izhmash.

World War II 
During World War II, Engineering Plant No. 74 served as the main firearm manufacturer for the Soviet Armed Forces. Since Operation Barbarossa left the Soviet Union in a very desperate position, the plant produced as many firearms as it was physically capable of, more firearms than its lifespan for 92 years prior. From 1941 to 1942, the plant set up mass production of Vasily Degtyarev's PTRD anti-tank rifle, Sergei Simonov's PTRS-41 anti-tank rifle, the Berezin UB aircraft machine gun armament, the 37mm Shpitalny Sh-37 and Nudelman-Suranov NS-37 aircraft guns, and sniper rifles with optic sights, along with the TT pistol and the Nagant M1895 revolver. A total of 11,450,000 rifles and carbines were produced in the plant, exceeding all the combined German firearm manufacturers' outputs of 10.3 million. Besides firearms, the plant also produced over 15,000 aircraft guns and over 130,000 anti-tank weapons.

On 20 July 1942, Plant No. 622 separated itself from Plant No. 74, using equipment transferred from the evacuated mechanical plants at Tula and Podolsk. During the war, the plant manufactured more than 1 million pistols and 200,000 anti-tank rifles. Plant No. 622 would later be renamed as the Izhevsk Mechanical Plant, or simply, Izhmekh.

Post-World War II 
After World War II, the Izhevsk Machine-Building Plant later recovered the production of its civilian arms and transportation. The plant also hired war veteran and ex-tank driver and mechanic, Mikhail T. Kalashnikov, after noticing his submachine gun design that gave him distinction as a gun designer. In 1947, Kalashnikov created his assault rifle, the 7.62×39mm AK-47. The AK-47 became the standard rifle of the Soviet Army in the same year, and later grew popular around the world. The AK-47 gave the plant fame and newer potential in the arms industry. The plant also created newer hunting weapons based out of the Mosin–Nagant rifle as well as sporting weapons. These sporting weapons helped the Soviet Union's team to win shooting competitions in European championships and the Summer Olympic Games numerous times.

Kalashnikov later designed newer firearms: the AKM and the AK-74 assault rifle, the RPK light machine gun, and the PK belt-fed machine gun. These firearms helped contribute to greater firepower for the Soviet Army as well as numerous nations that had imported them. Izhevsk Machine-Building Plant gun designer Yevgeny Dragunov also help contribute to the plant's fame by creating his SVD sniper rifle. Designed in 1963 and based out of sporting rifles, the SVD became the squad support weapon for the Soviet Army in the same year as well as starting a new trend of semi-automatic sniper rifles.

In 1975, the Izhevsk Machine-Building Plant changed its name to the Izhmash Industrial Association.

Contemporary Era 
After the dissolution of the Soviet Union, Izhmash struggled with a decline in demand and competition with overseas firearm manufacturers. As a result, Izhmash created the Saiga semi-automatic rifle, and started producing the Tigr, a civilian version of the SVD which was created back in the 1970s, in batches. Izhmash also expanded to the Western market, which was extremely successful, especially with the Saiga. Izhmash also created two new sniper rifles, the SV-98 and the SV-99, which had a more enhanced fire precision than the regular SVD, for special units of the Russian Armed Forces.

Despite the success, by 2008, Izhmash was composed of numerous enterprises that were on the verge of bankruptcy. The Russian state corporation, Rostekhnologii (Russian Technologies, now Rostec), revealed the poor state Izhmash was in by 2010. Only 32 companies of Izhmash were actually operating with a multi-level management system, high overheads and doubled up functions. The combined liability of Izhmash in early 2011 was ₽19 billion. The use of the existing modern equipment hardly exceeded 20%.

As a result, Rostec took control of Izhmash and started restructuring and consolidating the company in 2011. According to Rostec, one of the objectives was to retain its research, industrial and human resources and turn Izhmash into a leading global small arms manufacturer. Izhmash was later reestablished through assets consolidation by 2012. As a result, there was a threefold increase in profits and a 10% cut in costs. In 2011, Izhmash increased the utilization rate of modern multipurpose equipment from 20% to 70%. The effect from the efforts to enhance production performance amounts to ₽100 million.

Kalashnikov Concern 
On 13 August 2013, Izhmash and Izhmekh (formerly Izhevsk Mechanical Plant) merged, with the new concern named Kalashnikov Concern. Thanks to the merger, Kalashnikov Concern is Russia's largest and most important arms manufacturer.

In July 2014, Kalashnikov Concern was sanctioned by the United States and the European Union as a result of the Russian annexation of Crimea and Russian military intervention in Ukraine. Since Europe and the United States were the largest customers of the concern's civilian firearms, the concern was forced to rethink its marketing strategy. The concern opened five new markets and started selling its civilian firearms to ten new foreign countries, which helped the concern make up for its losses.

In the same year, Kalashnikov Concern has presented "Strategy 2020", which includes technical re-equipment and production modernization. When implemented, the project will qualitatively improve production technology and greatly reduce running costs and energy consumption while also improving working conditions and overall productivity.

On 9 February 2017, Rostec's management board gave permission to transfer Kalashnikov Concern to private investors. As of now, Rostec owns 26% of the concern while private investors own 74%.

In 2022, the Concern had reportedly achieved a 40% record yearly increase in weapons production for domestic needs and for export and also completed one licensed production agreement.

Organization 
JSC "Kalashnikov Concern" has its headquarters in city of Izhevsk and the Khamovniki District in the capital city of Moscow.

JSC "Kalashnikov Concern" is composed of the two largest firearm manufacturers in Izhevsk:
 JSC "Kalashnikov Concern" – JSC "Kalashnikov Concern" produces and tests combat small arms, sporting and hunting weapons, aircraft guns, precision guided artillery shells, test and control machines of complexes, as well as machines and high-quality tools. This company is also the mother company of the holding company JSC "Kalashnikov Concern" as well. The company is formerly known as the Izhevsk Machine-Building Plant, also known as Izhmash.
 JSC "Izhevsk Mechanical Plant" – Also known as Izhmekh, the Izhevsk Mechanical Plant is focusing on modern technologies of machine building, metallurgy, instrument making, microelectronics, producing civil and service weapons, power tools, packaging equipment, oil and gas equipment, medical equipment, precision steel casting.
JSC "Kalashnikov Concern" divides its firearm products into three brands.
 Kalashnikov – Kalashnikov produces military weapons such as firearms as well as vehicles.
 Baikal – Baikal produces hunting firearms and jackets
 Izhmash – Izhmash creates sporting firearms out of the basis of weapons of Kalashnikov Concern.
JSC "Kalashnikov Concern" has four subsidiaries:
 JSC "Mytishchi Machine Building Plant" – The JSC "Mytishchi Machine Building Plant" specializes in caterpillar chassis as well as tracked vehicles.
 JSC "Vympel Shipbuilding Plant" – JSC "Vympel Shipbuilding Plant" produces civilian, military, and utility boats.
 LLC "Rybinsk Shipyard" – LLC "Rybinsk Shipyard" is a shipbuilding company that produces high-speed boats and motor yachts.
 Zala Aero – Zala Aero is actually composed of several companies, and produces mainly unmanned aerial vehicles.

Corporate governance 
Vladimir Grodetsky, who headed Izhmash NPO since 1996 as general director left the bureau in 2011. He was later replaced by Maxim Kuzyuk, who left the bureau in June 2012. Alexander Kosov was later appointed as a temporary general director of the bureau from June to December. In December 2012, Konstantin Busygin was appointed general director of Izhmash. Busygin was later responsible for transformation of Izhmash and Izhmekh into the JSC "Kalashnikov" Concern, of which he became CEO.

On 30 January 2014, Rostec's supervisory board approved the appointment of Alexei Krivoruchko, its new shareholder, as CEO of the Kalashnikov Concern, replacing Konstantin Busygin. He took up his duties on 31 January 2014. According to the interlocutor of the agency, since 2011, this is the fourth change of the general director at the enterprise.

In August 2021 Vladimir Lepin was appointed Kalashnikov Concern CEO in place of Dmitry Tarasov.

General Directors of Izhmash NPO (1993–2013) 
 Vladimir Grodetsky (1996–2011)
 Maxim Kuzyuk (2011 – June 2012)
 Alexander Kosov (acting: June 2012 – December 2012)
 Konstantin Busygin (December 2012 – August 2013)

CEOs of Kalashnikov Concern (2013–present) 
 Konstantin Busygin (August 2013 – January 2014)
 Alexei Krivoruchko (January 2014 – June 2018)
 Vladimir Dmitriyev (June 2018 - August 2019)
 Dmitry Tarasov (September 2019 - August 2021)
 Vladimir Lepin (August 2021 – present)

Products

Izhevsk Arsenal 
Although the arsenal was under construction in 1807, production of weapons immediately started: mainly long guns, pistols, and backswords. One notable long gun the arsenal made was the No. 15 17.7mm muskets, of which 6,000 of them were supplied to the Imperial Russian Army. The arsenal later manufactured rifles, muskets, carbines, and flint blunderbusses for cavalry in 1809. The venture also produced pistols and gun parts and remelted trophy weapons. Firearms were produced at a rapid pace for the Russian Army during the Napoleonic Wars, mainly in the French invasion of Russia, even though construction of the armory had not been finished yet. During the first four years, the factory produced 2,000 long guns. In 1814, the output grew up to 10,000 guns and almost 2,500 backswords. By 1830, the armory achieved the desired annual output of 25,000 long guns and 5,000 backswords.

Starting in the 1830s, the armory started manufacturing "Gartung" short rifles, "Phalis" breech-loading rifles, and boarding guns for the Baltic Fleet of the Imperial Russian Navy. In 1835, the armory transferred cold steel production of swords and lances to Zlatoust, focusing mainly on firearm production. In 1844, the armory started upgrading current guns into more rapid firing percussion muskets. The armory also started using the caplock mechanism for its products in 1845. During the Crimean War, Izhevsk supplied the Russian Imperial Army with 130,000 rifles, with a third of them grooved. By 1857, 50 years after the creation of the armory, over 670,000 flintlock firearms, over 220,000 percussion firearms, over 58 thousand rifles, as well as a plentiful number of swords and lances were produced. When the methods of high-quality steel production were well mastered, Izhevsk became the source of gun barrels and barrel receivers for Russian plants. For example, armory enterprises in Tula used annually up to 360,000 barrels from the armory at Izhevsk.

In 1867, the armory was reorganized into a lease and a private commercial enterprise. At this time, the armory were renovated and it was equipped with steam-engines, new machines, and an open-hearth furnace. This allowed the armory to produce more breech-loading weapons for the Russian Imperial Army, notably the "Krnk" and "Berdan" type rifles. The Berdan rifle, designed by American firearm expert and inventor Hiram Berdan, became the standard issue rifle of the Imperial Russian Army in 1870. The Berdan rifle was the most produced firearm of the plant at the time as well, allowing Russia to approach the European industrial empires' level of armaments.

Izhevsk Gun and Steel Factories 
In 1884, the plant was returned to the state and became Izhevsk Gun and Steel Factories (IGSF). In 1885, IGSF started manufacturing hunting weapons and tools. In 1891, IGSF started mass-producing the Mosin–Nagant bolt-action military rifle in a development of nine years, based on the design of the 1898 Mauser rifle (Gewehr 98) with new unique features such as a push feed recessed bolt head. In addition to being one of the most produced rifles in mass-produced military bolt-action rifles in history, the Nagant is also used in every war from the time it was developed to the modern day. The rifle was produced from both the Imperial period and the Soviet era, with military production concluded in 1965, but production for civilian use is continued to the modern day. In addition to the Mosin–Nagant rifle, Belgian industrialist Léon Nagant, who was a co-inventor of, developed the Nagant M1895 revolver. The revolver has a unique "gas-seal" system that provides a boost to muzzle velocity as well as make the weapon suppressed. The sidearm, like the Nagant rifle, was produced in the Soviet era as well, and was mass-produced and used widespread.

Izhevsk Machine-Building Plant

Izhmash

Kalashnikov Concern

Kalashnikov CV-1
On August 23, 2018, Kalashnikov Concern introduced a new electric car prototype, the CV-1. Its exterior design was based on the rare 1970s Soviet large family car IZh 2125 "Kombi". The range on one charge was claimed to be 350 km.

Kalashnikov UV-4
Alongside the reveal of the CV-1, Kalashnikov also showed a prototype for the UV-4 4-door electric quadricycle, with a taxi variant being revealed in August 2019. The UV-4 was shown again in patent images later in November 2021, this time along with a 3-wheel, 2-door vehicle based on it.

See also 
Kalashnikov USA

 Defense industry of Russia
 List of companies of Russia
 List of modern armament manufacturers
 Other Russian firearm companies
 OJSC Degtyarev Plant
 OJSC Vyatskiye Polyany Molot Machine-Building Plant 
 TsNIITochMash
 TsKIB SOO
 International large firearm companies
 Colt's Manufacturing Company
 FN Herstal
 Heckler & Koch
 Sig Sauer
 Fabryka Broni

Notes

References 
 Lapin, Terence W. (2003). The Mosin–Nagant Rifle, 3rd ed. Tustin, California: North Cape Publications. .
 Lapin, Terence W. (2013). The Mosin–Nagant Rifle, 6th ed. Tustin, California: North Cape Publications. .
 Wilson, Royce: "The Nagant M1895 Revolver". Australian & New Zealand Handgun, Issue 4 (January 2006).

External links
  (Russian only)
 Facebook profile
 VKontakte profile
 YouTube channel (English)
 YouTube channel (Russian)

 
1807 establishments in the Russian Empire
Manufacturing companies established in 1807
Firearm manufacturers of Russia
Russian brands
Izhevsk
Defence companies of the Soviet Union
Rostec
Companies nationalised by the Soviet Union
Companies based in Udmurtia
Companies formerly listed on the Moscow Exchange
Golden Idea national award winners
Russian entities subject to the U.S. Department of the Treasury sanctions
Corporate groups